Alpha and Omega is a series of animated films produced by Crest Animation Productions and distributed by Lionsgate Films. The first film was released in 2010 and featured the voices of Justin Long and Hayden Panettiere, though subsequent films were direct-to-video and therefore featured a smaller cast, primarily Ben Diskin and Kate Higgins.

Films

Alpha and Omega (2010)

After park rangers capture and ship them all the way across North America, omega wolf Humphrey (Justin Long) and alpha wolf Kate (Hayden Panettiere) find them in the woods very far from home so they must travel far to get home and stop the pack from fighting.

Alpha and Omega 2: A Howl-iday Adventure (2013)
Kate (Kate Higgins), Humphrey (Benjamin Diskin) and their 3 new pups (Stinky, Claudette and Runt) are happily preparing to celebrate their first winter together when their smallest pup, Runt, is kidnapped by rogue wolves, led by a power-hungry wolf named King, as part of a plan to take over their home. They must now go on a new journey across the wilderness to find and bring back Runt & save their home before the winter snows block their way home. While their adventure does not end exactly as planned, Kate and Humphrey discover that "Home is where the family is."

Alpha and Omega 3: The Great Wolf Games (2014)
Once a year, all the alphas in the packs set aside their differences for some friendly competition. When an unexpected accident puts many of the packs' star alpha wolves out of commission, a new team representing the Western side of the area is assembled that includes forest friends not in the pack. After Stinky, Claudette, and Runt find a group, including a bear named Brent and his porcupine friend & protector Agnes, they compete in a series of games to win the prize against a Northern all alpha team. At the end, Humphrey's team wins and, in a fit of rage after Fleet, an alpha whom Claudette falls in love with, yells at his father, Nars, for pushing his own dreams on him, Nars raises a paw to strike Fleet. Fleet flinches revealing that he has abused him before. Nars then sees the error in his ways and walks off, sad and defeated.

Alpha and Omega 4: The Legend of the Saw Tooth Cave (2014)

After exploring the haunted Saw Tooth Cave and finding a wolf who has been driven away from her pack, Runt (Dee Dee Greene) musters all of his courage to help her. The wolf, named Daria, is protected by a mysterious wolf spirit, presumably her deceased mother who was then killed by her pack's leader for hiding her, after being driven out of the pack when she was a pup, and hunted down for being blind. The spirit of Saw Tooth Cave then found her and protects her from any intruder in the cave, leading Runt to go on an adventure to help her find a true family and fend off her old pack.

Alpha and Omega 5: Family Vacation (2015)
After going on a family vacation with Runt, Claudette, Stinky, & their friends, Humphrey and Kate stumble upon two female wolves running from a trapper, who intends to relocate them across the country. The five of them then try to flee and escape two trappers, Griffin and Jethro, on their tails. Throughout the film, the gang begin to reminisce over their first three adventures as they run from trappers and bears.

Alpha and Omega 6: Dino Digs (2016)
Kate, Humphrey, and the pups temporarily stayed at a nature reserve, where the pups befriend Amy, a friendly raptor who is brought back to life by a magical burial ground that gets activated by the sun's light. However, as human diggers, led by a greedy man named Mac and two former trappers Griffin and Jethro from the fifth movie, dig up the sacred burial ground, a ferocious Tyrannosaurus Rex also resurrects and terrorizes the forest. Amy and the wolves divert the Rex back to the sacred burial ground where the ray of light sends them back to their time. Mac's twin brother Ian promises to never disturb nature again.

Alpha and Omega 7: The Big Fureeze (2016)
Claudette, Runt, and Stinky embark on a journey to rescue their parents from bears when they get lost on a hunting trip during an especially harsh winter. At the same time, they are pursued by vengeful rogue wolves led by King from the second film. Eventually, they reunite with their parents, evaded the bears, and defeated the rogue wolves.

Alpha and Omega 8: Journey to Bear Kingdom (2017)
Queen Bear and Princess Canue come to visit the forest, and it's up to Kate, Humphrey, and the pups to protect them from a devious effort to take over their kingdom by two rival bears, Strom and Claws, that have teamed up with the Rogue Pack led by King Rogue and attempt to overthrow King Bear and the royal bear family. However, they are eventually defeated by the bears and the wolves working together to fend off the rogue pack and the traitorous bears.

Reception

Critical reception

Box office performance

Characters

Note: A light grey cell indicates the character who did not appear in that film.

References

External links

2010s comedy films
2010s American animated films
Computer-animated films
2010s English-language films
American animated comedy films
Animated films about wolves
Lionsgate animated films
Films set in Alberta
Films set in Idaho
Animated film series